"You Always Know the DJ" is a song by Australian rapper Allday. It was released in September 2014 as the third single from the Allday's debut studio album Startup Cult. The singles was certified gold in Australia in 2018.

Track listing
Digital download
 "You Always Know the DJ" (MD remix) – 3:38
 "You Always Know the DJ" – 3:50

Certifications

References

Allday songs
2014 songs
2014 singles
Songs written by Allday